Santo Lake  is a lake in the Province of Parma, Emilia-Romagna, Italy. At an elevation of 1507 m, its surface area is 0.0815 km2.

Overview
The outflow is the small river Parma di Lago Santo. After about 4 km it join with Parma di Badignana and the river then takes the name of Parma.

Lakes of Emilia-Romagna
Glacial lakes